The 1926 Brown Bears football team, often called "the Iron Men", represented Brown University in 1926 college football season. They were led by first-year head coach Tuss McLaughry. The Bears compiled a 9–0–1 record, outscored their opponents 223–36, and recorded seven defensive shutouts.

The 1926 Bears were nicknamed the "Iron Men" because of the significant play time the first squad saw in several key games. Against Yale, Brown's starters played every minute of the game without substitution and won, 7–0. The following week, the same eleven played the duration of the 10–0 win over Dartmouth, another period powerhouse. In order to rest his starters, McLaughry fielded the second string the next weekend against , and they won decisively, 27–0. A week later at Harvard Stadium, the Iron Men played 58 minutes of the 26–0 shutout of the Crimson, their third and final Ancient Eight opponent. McLaughry sent in the substitutes for the final two minutes so that they would earn their varsity letters. In the season's finale, Colgate held the Iron Men to a tie, 10–10.

The 9–0–1 record remains Brown's only undefeated season to date. Back Roy Randall and end Hal Broda were named first-team All-Americans by the Associated Press and United Press, respectively. The Iron Men consisted of the following eleven players: Thurston Towle, Hal Broda, Ed Lawrence, and Roy Randall.

Schedule

See also
 One-platoon system, "iron man football"

References

Brown
Brown Bears football seasons
College football undefeated seasons
Brown Bears football